This is a list of countries ordered by physiological density. "Arable land" is defined by the UN's Food and Agriculture Organization, the source of "Arable land (hectares per person)" as land under temporary crops (double-cropped areas are counted once), temporary meadows for mowing or for pasture, land under market or kitchen gardens, and land temporarily fallow. Land abandoned as a result of shifting cultivation is excluded.

Ranking

Notes

References

External links
 Arable land (hectares per person) (worldbank.org)

Lists of countries by population density
Countries by real population density (based on food growing capacity)
Food security